Darren Penhall (born 18 November 1972) is an English-Australian professional darts player who competes in Professional Darts Corporation events.

Career
Penhall entered Q-School in January 2020 and won his Tour Card on the fourth day by finishing eleventh on the UK Q-School Order of Merit. He will play on the PDC ProTour in 2020 and 2021.

After losing his Tour Card, he returned to Australia, and took part in the DPA Tour from 2023, and he won a title in February 2023.

References

External links

1972 births
Living people
Professional Darts Corporation former tour card holders
English darts players